Rai Bahadur Sri Ram CIE was an Indian advocate and Government pledger from Lucknow.

He was elected to the Council of India on 3 October 1904 as a non-official member representing the United Provinces. Gopal Krishna Gokhale was also the member to the Council.

References

19th-century Indian lawyers
Scholars from Lucknow
Companions of the Order of the Indian Empire
Members of the Council of India
Rai Bahadurs
20th-century Indian lawyers